Yo Soy (English: I Am) is the debut studio album by Mexican-American singer Pee Wee. It was released on August 11, 2009, by EMI Latin.

Singles
 "Cumbayá" was the lead single of the album. "Cumbayá" was released on May 26, 2009, and was released worldwide on June 1, 2009. "Cumbayá" was released on iTunes on June 30, 2009.
 "Quédate" was the second official single of the album. Pee Wee debuted the song live on El Show de los Sueños in November 2008. Back later the song was officially taken as the third official single on December 24, 2009.

Other songs
 "Life Is a Dance Floor" was the first solo track. Pee Wee sang the song live for the first time on 2008 Premios Juventud on July 17, 2008. It was thought that it would be the first single but it was never released as an official single or studio version, however for unknown reasons the song wasn't included on the album, only as a pre-order bonus track on iTunes.
 "Tan Feliz" was the promotional single of the album. "Tan Feliz" was released on September 6, 2009, and chosen to promote Camaleones.
 "Esto Es Amor" was a song that was recorded but wasn't included on the album. The song was released on Rhapsody.com on July 21, 2009.

Track listing

Charts

References

External links
 Pee Wee official website

2009 debut albums
Pee Wee (singer) albums
Albums produced by Luny Tunes
Albums produced by Noriega
EMI Latin albums
Spanish-language albums